Liverwurst, leberwurst, or liver sausage is a kind of sausage made from liver. It is eaten in many parts of Europe, including Austria, Bulgaria, Croatia, the Czech Republic, Denmark, Finland, Germany, Hungary, Latvia, Netherlands, Norway, Poland, Romania (especially in Transylvania), Russia, Serbia, Slovakia, Slovenia, Sweden, Ukraine, United Kingdom; it is also found in North and South America, notably in Argentina and Chile.

Some liverwurst varieties are spreadable.  Liverwurst usually contains pigs' or calves' liver. Other ingredients are meat (notably veal), fat, and spices including ground black pepper, marjoram, allspice, thyme, ground mustard seed, and nutmeg. Many regions in Germany have distinct recipes for liverwurst. Adding ingredients like pieces of onion or bacon to the recipe make each variety of liverwurst very important to cultural identity. For example, the Thüringer Leberwurst (Thuringian liverwurst) has a Protected Geographical Status throughout the EU. Recently, more exotic additions such as cowberries and mushrooms have gained popularity.

Etymology

The word liverwurst is a partial calque of German  'liver sausage', and 'liver sausage', a full calque.

Variants 

In some parts of Germany, liverwurst is served sliced on a plate, often with mustard or pickled cucumber. 
It is most commonly eaten spread on bread, as it is very soft.

In the Netherlands, liverwurst is customarily served in slices, often with mustard.

In Hungary, liverwurst is customarily served on open sandwiches, or with cheese as a filling for pancakes which are baked in the oven.

Unlike the German sausage  that uses beef, the  uses only pork.

 is eaten mainly for the winter holidays. It tastes fragrant and sweet with liver pâté. It is generally used as Christmas Eve dinner, sliced on bread with mustard and murături.

Liverwurst is typically eaten as is, and often served as traditional or as open-faced sandwiches. It is popular in North America with red onion and mustard on rye or whole grain bread. In the Southern and Midwestern US, liverwurst is served with slices of sweet pickles (gherkins pickled with vinegar, sugar, and mustard seeds). In the Northeast US, liverwurst is served with dill pickles (gherkins pickled with vinegar, salt, and dill).

In the Midwestern US, liverwurst is also known as liver sausage. If smoked, it is known as braunschweiger. Liverwurst is typically served on crackers or in sandwiches. It is often sold pre-sliced.

The Polish  is made using calf's liver. It is often served on rye bread with horseradish-style mustard.  is popular throughout the year, but is most frequently served at Christmas and Easter.

See also

 Chopped liver
 List of smoked foods
 Livermush
Liver pâté
 Pâté
 Mazzafegato

Notes and references

External links

German sausages
Hungarian sausages
Liver (food)
Cuisine of the Midwestern United States
Romanian cuisine
Smoked meat
Precooked sausages